Tiziano Manca (born 27 June 1970) is an Italian composer of contemporary classical music.

Biography
Born in Squinzano, Italy, Tiziano Manca attended the Faculty of Philosophy and the Conservatory in Florence, studying Electronic Music and Composition with Romano Pezzati and Salvatore Sciarrino. He undertook also further studies in conducting with Piero Bellugi.

In 2001 he was composer-in-residence in Japan (Akiyoshidai International Art Village), in 2001–2002 in Royaumont (Paris) and in 2002–2003 at the Akademie Schloss Solitude (Stuttgart).

His music has been performed in Amsterdam (Gaudeamus Music Week), Anvers (Ars Musica), Stuttgart (Theaterhaus), Darmstadt (Ferienkurse), Lucerne (Lucerne Festival), Paris (Théâtre Dunois, Abbaye de Royaumont), Lille (Opera), Stuttgart (Theaterhaus), Berlin (Konzerthaus) and Japan (Akiyoshidai International Art Village).

Tiziano Manca is also a researcher. He will defend a doctorate on rhythm and rhythm notation in Western music theory and practice in 2022.

Selected works
Deserto colore for Voice and Piano (1998)
Ondine for Chamber Orchestra (1998)
Flatus vocis for Flute (1999)
Deux Epigrammes amoureuses et un intimation for Clarinet, Violin, Cello, Voice, Percussion and Piano (2000)
Narcisse for two Baritones (2001–2002)
Nel labirinto for Trumpet, Trombone, Percussion, Bass Drum, Guitar, Cello, Piano (2003)
Limen for Tenor Sax, Guitar and Marimba (2003)
La Gabbia opera in un atto (2003–2004) Libretto di Alejandro Tantanian
Moi, Daniel G. for Countertenor, Violin, Bariton Saxophon, Piano (2005) Text by Samuel Beckett
Nell'assenza dei venti for Chamber Orchestra (2006)
Defining for Flute, Clarinet, Vibraphon, Violin, Viola, Cello, Piano (2007–2009)

References and external links

Personal website of the composer

Specific

1970 births
20th-century classical composers
21st-century classical composers
Italian classical composers
Italian male classical composers
Living people
20th-century Italian composers
20th-century Italian male musicians
21st-century Italian male musicians